The Senawang Komuter station, is a Malaysian commuter rail station serving as a halt on the KTM Komuter Seremban Line. It was constructed as part of the double tracking and electrification project between Seremban and Gemas, undertaken by IRCON International, a subsidiary of Indian Railways. The station began revenue service on 14 May 2011.

Location

The station serves Senawang and is the closest station to some of Seremban's outer suburbs such as Paroi, Rahang, Forest Heights and Taman Seremban Jaya down south. The station is located near the three-way intersection of the North South Expressway's Senawang Exit, the Federal Route 1 and Persiaran Senawang 1.

References

External links

 KL MRT and Komuter Integration

Seremban Line